Gobi paratha ("cauliflower paratha") is a type of paratha or (flatbread), originating from the Indian subcontinent, that is stuffed with flavored cauliflower and vegetables. It can be consumed as breakfast or an appetizer.

Preparation 
The dough is made from flour. The stuffing is made from cauliflower and a mix of spices such as cumin, ginger, and turmeric powder. The filling is placed in the rolled dough, folded into a ball, and rolled out again. The paratha is cooked on the stovetop.

Gobi paratha are often eaten with raita.

See also
 List of bread dishes

References

External links
 Gobhi Paratha recipe
 भारतीय परांठा लिस्ट  

Indian cuisine
Indian breads